Josiah St. John (born May 18, 1992) is a professional Canadian football offensive tackle for the Edmonton Elks of the Canadian Football League (CFL). He played college football with the Oklahoma Sooners.

Professional career

Saskatchewan Roughriders
St. John was ranked as the fifth best player available in the 2016 CFL Draft by the CFL's Central Scouting Bureau. He was the first overall selection in the 2016 CFL Draft by the Saskatchewan Roughriders, but he was in a contract dispute with the team at the start of the 2016 season. He finally signed with the team on July 4, 2016 after missing all of training camp and the Roughriders' first game of the season. Over three years with the Roughriders, he dressed in 22 games and started in eight (including six games started in his rookie year) before becoming a free agent in 2019.

Toronto Argonauts
On May 19, 2019, St. John signed with the Toronto Argonauts. He was part of the Argonauts' training camp cuts on June 7, 2019.

BC Lions
St. John signed a practice roster agreement with the BC Lions on September 9, 2019. He was released from the practice roster on November 1, 2019.

Edmonton Eskimos
On November 5, 2019, St. John was added to the practice roster of the Edmonton Eskimos. He dressed in the 2019 East Final for the team and became a free agent on February 11, 2020.

Saskatchewan Roughriders (second stint)
After becoming a free agent, St. John re-signed with the Saskatchewan Roughriders on February 12, 2020. He signed a one-year contract extension with the team on January 6, 2021.

Edmonton Elks (second stint)
St. John joined the Edmonton Elks as a free agent on February 14, 2023.

References

External links
Saskatchewan Roughriders bio

1992 births
Living people
Canadian football offensive linemen
Canadian football people from Toronto
Players of Canadian football from Ontario
Saskatchewan Roughriders players
Oklahoma Sooners football players
Canadian players of American football
American football offensive linemen
BC Lions players
Edmonton Elks players